The Jaguar C-X75 is a hybrid-electric, 2-seat, concept car produced by British automobile manufacturer  Jaguar Cars in partnership with the derivative of the Formula One team, Williams Advanced Engineering which debuted at the 2010 Paris Motor Show. The powertrain of the C-X75 concept is rated at  through four YASA electric motors, each of which drives one of the four wheels. The batteries driving these motors are recharged using two diesel-fed micro gas turbines instead of a conventional four-stroke engine. It was described as a design study that would influence future design and technology.

In May 2011 Jaguar announced a limited production of the C-X75 from 2013 to 2015, with a compact, forced induction petrol engine combined with electric motors instead of the micro gas turbines in the concept car. A maximum of 250 cars were planned to be built in partnership with Williams Advanced Engineering. In December 2012, the company announced the cancellation of production due to the ongoing global economic crisis. Five developmental prototypes were produced in the production car specifications in 2013. The car was featured in the 2015 film Spectre, the twenty-fourth James Bond film in which seven cars were supplied to the film makers.

Engine and performance

Inherent in the drivetrain is the ability to independently drive each wheel across the full speed range, known as Torque Vectoring. Each motor weighs .

Among other advantages, the micro turbines used in the C-X75 can be run on a range of fuels including diesel, biofuels, compressed natural gas and liquid petroleum gas. The 15 kWh lithium ion battery pack weighs . Jaguar estimated an average carbon emission of 28 g/km on European test cycle, however, the carbon emission is around 150g/km if the turbines are running.

Jaguar also focused on the aerodynamics in order to improve performance. For example, the carbon-fibre rear diffuser that guides airflow from under the car creating down-force, and includes an active aerofoil and is lowered automatically as speed increases. Moreover, the C-X75 features an extruded and bonded, aerospace-inspired, aluminium chassis, saving weight and improving sustainability and performance.

Production
In May 2011 Jaguar unveiled plans to produce the C-X75; the company had planned to produce a maximum of 250 cars in partnership with Williams Advanced Engineering. The decision was part of a  investment plan, announced by Jaguar Land Rover (JLR) in March 2011 at the Geneva Motor Show, to launch 40 "significant new products" over the next five years. The model was scheduled to be built from 2013 until 2015, although it had not yet been decided where the production would take place.

The C-X75 was to be built without the micro-turbines, instead, the production version would use a downsized, forced induction petrol engine, with one electric motor at each axle. In order to create a lightweight strong structure, the chassis was planned to be made of carbon-fibre, and the engine was to be mid-mounted for optimum weight distribution and to retain the concept's silhouette.

Cancellation
In December 2012, Jaguar's Global Brand Director announced the cancellation of production due to the ongoing global economic crisis, as the carmaker considered that " it seems the wrong time to launch an £800,000 to £1 million supercar." The company expected to take advantage of part of the investment in the C-X75 development by using the C-X75 technology in future Jaguar cars. The Jaguar F-type was heavily influenced from the C-X75 and carried over many design cues and technological features from it. Jaguar announced its decision to continue working on five prototypes to be developed until May 2013. These prototypes featured a 1.6-litre turbocharged and supercharged inline-4 engine coupled with two YASA electric motors placed on each axle of the car. Up to three of these prototypes were then sold at auction, while one went to a future Jaguar museum, and one was kept by Jaguar for running demonstrations. One of these prototypes was also featured in the 2015 James Bond film, Spectre.

Appearance in Spectre

A Jaguar C-X75 (painted in dark orange) appears in the 2015 James Bond film Spectre as Mr. Hinx's car (licensed ROMA 860K). It takes part in a car chase around Rome against James Bond, who drives an Aston Martin DB10. Jaguar supplied seven examples to the filmmakers. Although the cars are visually faithful to the original C-X75 concept, they are mechanically unrelated. According to JLR Special Vehicle Operations chief John Edwards, the cars are "constructed around a spaceframe built to World Rally Championship spec" and powered by a dry sump V8 engine. Although this new appearance of the C-X75 led to speculation that production plans for the car were being revived, Edwards was quoted as saying "the film was an opportunity to showcase C-X75, but it doesn’t mean a change in strategy." The car was built in collaboration with Williams Advanced Engineering.

See also
 Jaguar C-X16 – Jaguar's smaller 2011 hybrid 2-seat sports car concept
 List of modern production plug-in electric vehicles

References

External links

 
 C-X75 page at the Jaguar Daimler Heritage Trust

C-X75
Cars introduced in 2010
Electric sports cars
Coupés
Cars powered by gas turbines
Partial zero-emissions vehicles
Plug-in hybrid vehicles